Kauehi, or Putake, is an atoll in the Tuamotu group in French Polynesia. The nearest land is Raraka Atoll, located 17 km to the Southeast. Kauehi has a wide lagoon measuring 24 km by 18 km.
Kauehi's lagoon has one navigable pass.

The atoll has 257 inhabitants . The main village is called Tearavero.

History
Even though Kauehi Atoll was probably well known to the pearl traders, the first recorded European to visit it was the Beagle's captain Robert FitzRoy in 1835. Kauehi was later visited by the United States Exploring Expedition, 1838–1842. Charles Wilkes called the atoll "Vincennes" after his ship.

Administration
Kauehi Atoll belongs to the commune of Fakarava, which consists of Fakarava, as well as the atolls of Aratika, Kauehi, Niau, Raraka, Taiaro and Toau.

References

Atolls of the Tuamotus